Five Points is an unincorporated community in Chester Township, Wells County, in the U.S. state of Indiana.

Geography

References

Unincorporated communities in Wells County, Indiana
Unincorporated communities in Indiana